Mohammad Biriya and the original name Mohammad Baghezadeh (1914 in Tabriz – 1985 in Tabriz) was an Iranian Azerbaijani poet and politician. by Ja'far Pishevari with the formation Azerbaijan People's Government in 1945, was Culture Minister of Azerbaijan's Government.

Notes

References
 *

People from Tabriz
1914 births
1985 deaths
Azerbaijani Democratic Party politicians
Azerbaijani independence activists
Tudeh Party of Iran politicians